Juncus orthophyllus is a species of rush known by the common name straightleaf rush native to western North America from British Columbia to California and Nevada, where it grows in moist spots in mountain habitat, such as meadows.

Description
There are several flattened leaves around the stem bases, and sometimes one or more smaller leaves on the stem. The inflorescence is an open array of several clusters of up to 10 flowers each. The flower has rough-textured green segments with brown edges and bristles at the tips.

External links
Jepson Manual Treatment
Photo gallery

orthophyllus
Plants described in 1893
Flora of the Western United States
Flora of British Columbia
Flora without expected TNC conservation status